Phosphinidenes (IUPAC: phosphanylidenes, formerly phosphinediyls) are low-valent phosphorus compounds analogous to carbenes and nitrenes, having the general structure RP. The "free" form of these compounds is conventionally described as having a singly-coordinated phosphorus atom containing only 6 electrons in its valence level. Most phosphinidenes are highly reactive and short-lived, thereby complicating empirical studies on their chemical properties. In the last few decades, several strategies have been employed to stabilize phosphinidenes (e.g. π-donation, steric protection, transition metal complexation), and researchers have developed a number of reagents and systems that can generate and transfer phosphinidenes as reactive intermediates in the synthesis of various organophosphorus compounds.

Electronic Structure 
Like carbenes, phosphinidenes can exist in either a singlet state or triplet state, with the triplet state typically being more stable. The stability of these states and their relative energy difference (the singlet-triplet energy gap) is dependent on the substituents.  The ground state in the parent phosphinidene (PH) is a triplet that is 22 kcal/mol more stable than the lowest singlet state. This singlet-triplet energy gap is considerably larger than that of the simplest carbene methylene (9 kcal/mol).

Ab initio calculations from Nguyen et al. found that alkyl- and silyl-substituted phosphinidenes have triplet ground states, possibly in-part due to a negative hyperconjugation effect that stabilizes the triplet more than the singlet. Substituents containing lone pairs (e.g. -NX2, -OX, -PX2 ,-SX) were found to stabilize the singlet state, presumably by π-donation into an empty phosphorus 3p orbital; in most of these cases, the energies of the lowest singlet and triplet states were close to degenerate. A singlet ground state could be induced in amino- and phosphino-phosphinidenes by introducing bulky β-substituents, which are thought to destabilize the triplet state by distorting the pyramidal geometry through increased nuclear repulsion.

Stable Monomeric Phosphino-Phosphinidene
Bertrand and coworkers synthesized a stable singlet phosphino-phosphinidene compound using extremely bulky substituents. Hitherto, there had been no free singlet phosphinidenes that were characterized by spectroscopy. The authors prepared a chlorodiazaphospholidine with bulky (2,6-bis[(4-tert-butylphenyl)methyl]-4-methylphenyl) groups, and then synthesized the corresponding phosphaketene. Subsequent photolytic decarbonylation of the phosphaketene produced the phosphino-phosphinidene product as a yellow-orange solid that is stable at room temperature but decomposes immediately in the presence of air and moisture. 31P NMR spectroscopy shows assigned product peaks at 80.2 and -200.4 ppm, with a J-coupling constant of JPP = 883.7 Hz. The very high P-P coupling constant is indicative of P-P multiple bond character. The air/water sensitivity and high solubility of this compound prevented characterization by X-ray crystallography. 
Density functional theory and Natural bond orbital (NBO) calculations were used to gain insight into the structure and bonding of these phosphino-phosphinidenes. DFT calculations at the M06-2X/Def2-SVP level of theory on the phospino-phosphinidene with bulky 2,6-bis[4-tert-butylphenyl)methyl]-4-methylphenyl groups suggest that the tri-coordinated phosphorus atom exists in a planar environment. Calculations at the M06-2X/def2-TZVPP//M06-2X/def2-SVP level of theory were applied to a simplified model compound with diisopropylphenyl (Dipp) groups so as to reduce the computational cost for detailed NBO analysis. Inspection of the outputted wavefunctions shows that the HOMO and HOMO-1 are P-P π-bonding orbitals and the LUMO is a P-P π*-antibonding orbital. Further evidence of multiple bond character between the phosphorus atoms was provided by natural resonance theory and a large Wiberg bond index (P1-P2: 2.34). Natural population analysis assigned a negative partial charge to the terminal phosphorus atom (-0.34 q) and a positive charge to the tri-coordinated phosphorus atom (1.16 q).

Despite the negative charge on the terminal phosphorus atom, subsequent studies have shown that this particular phosphinidene is electrophilic at the phosphinidene center. This phosphino-phosphinidene reacts with a number of nucleophiles (CO, isocyanides, carbenes, phosphines, etc.) to form phosphinidene-nucleophile adducts  Upon nucleophilic addition, the tri-coordinated phosphorus atom becomes non-planar, and it is postulated that the driving force of the reaction is provided by the instability of the phosphinidene's planar geometry.

Phospha-Wittig Fragmentation 

In 1989, Fritz et al. synthesized the phospha-Wittig species shown to the right. Phospha-Wittig compounds can be viewed as a phosphinidene stabilized by a phosphine. These compounds have been given the label of "phospha-Wittig" as they have two dominant resonance structures (a neutral form and a zwitterionic form) that are analogous to those of the phosphonium ylides that are used in the Wittig reaction. 
Fritz et al. found that this particular phospha-Wittig reagent thermally decomposes at 20 °C to give tBu2PBr, LiBr, and cyclophosphanes. The authors proposed that the singlet phosphino-phosphinidene tBu2PP was formed as an intermediate in this reaction. Further evidence for this was provided by trapping experiments, where the thermal decomposition of the phospha-Wittig reagent in the presence of 3,4,-dimethyl-1,3-butadiene and cyclohexene gave rise to the products shown in the figure below.

Phosphinidene complexes
Terminal transition-metal-complexed phosphinidenes LnM=P-R are phosphorus analogs of transition metal carbene complexes where L is a spectator ligand. The first terminal phosphinidene complex was reported by Marinetti et al., who observed the formation of the transient species [(OC)5M=P-Ph] during the fragmentation of 7-phosphanorbornadiene molybdenum and tungsten complexes inside a mass spectrometer. Soon after, they discovered that these 7-phosphanorbornadiene complexes could be used to transfer the phosphinidene complex [(OC)5M=P-R] to various unsaturated substrates. 

Lappert and coworkers reported the first synthesis of a stable terminal phosphinidene complex: lithium metallocene hydrides [Cp2MHLi]4 of Mo and W were reacted with aryl-dichlorophosphines RPCl2 to yield Cp2M=P-R, which were able to be characterized by single crystal X-ray diffraction. 
 

More common than complexes of terminal phosphinidene ligands are cluster compounds wherein the phosphinidene is a triply and less commonly doubly bridging ligand.  One example is the ter-butylphosphinidene complex (t-BuP)Fe3(CO)10.

Dibenzo-7-phosphanorbornadiene derivatives 
A class of RPA (A = anthracene) compounds were developed and explored by Cummins and coworkers.  

Treatment of a bulky phosphine chloride (RPCl2) with magnesium anthracene affords a dibenzo-7-phosphanorbornadiene compound (RPA). Under thermal conditions, the RPA compound (R = NiPr2) decomposes to yield anthracene; kinetic experiments found this decomposition to be first-order. It was hypothesized that the amino-phosphinidene iPr2NP is formed as a transient intermediate species, and this was corroborated by an experiment where 1,3-cyclohexadiene was used as a trapping agent, forming anti-iPr2NP(C6H8).

Molecular beam mass spectrometry has enabled the detection of the evolution of amino-phosphinidene fragments from a number of alkylamide derivatives (e.g. Me2NP+ and Me2NPH+  from Me2NPA) in the gas-phase at elevated temperatures.

See also
 Carbene analog
Phosphorus compounds

References

  
Reactive intermediates
Organophosphorus compounds